Roz Kelly is an Australian television sports presenter.

She is the sports presenter for the Friday and Saturday editions of Nine News Sydney as well as host of the Nine Network’s flagship sports program Sports Sunday.

Kelly is also involved in Nine's Wide World of Sports coverage of Tennis, Cricket and Stan Sport’s Rugby Union coverage.

Personal life
She is married to South African cricketer Morné Morkel and they have 2 sons.

In 2012, Kelly dated TV vet Chris Brown.

In November 2013, Kelly announced she would be moving to Cape Town in South Africa to be with her then fiancé Morné Morkel. In 2018, Kelly announced she intended to return to Australia following her husband's retirement from international cricket.

See also

List of Nine Network presenters

References

External links 

Australian sports broadcasters
Living people
Australian television presenters
Nine News presenters
Year of birth missing (living people)
Australian women television presenters